Jesse Speight (September 22, 1795May 1, 1847) was a North Carolina and Mississippi politician in the nineteenth century.

Born in Greene County, North Carolina, Speight attended country schools as a child. He was a member of the North Carolina House of Commons in 1820, serving as Speaker of the House, and was a member of the North Carolina Senate from 1823 to 1827. He was elected to the United States House of Representatives in 1828, serving from 1829 to 1837, not being a candidate for renomination in 1836.

Speight moved to Plymouth, Mississippi and was a member of the Mississippi Senate from 1841 to 1844, serving as its president from 1842 to 1843. He was elected a Democrat to the United States Senate in 1844, serving from 1845 until his death, where he was chairman of the Committee on Engrossed Bills and Audit and Control the Contingent Expenses of the Senate. Speight died in Columbus, Mississippi on May 1, 1847, and was interred in Friendship Cemetery in Columbus.

His replacement as Senator was Jefferson Davis, the future President of the Confederate States of America.

See also
List of United States Congress members who died in office (1790–1899)

References

External links

1795 births
1847 deaths
People from Greene County, North Carolina
Members of the North Carolina House of Representatives
North Carolina state senators
Democratic Party Mississippi state senators
Democratic Party United States senators from Mississippi
Jacksonian members of the United States House of Representatives from North Carolina
19th-century American politicians
Democratic Party members of the United States House of Representatives from North Carolina